B-Side Ourselves is a studio EP by American heavy metal band Skid Row, released on September 22, 1992. It consists of cover versions of songs originally recorded by artists who influenced Skid Row. As the title suggests, most of the tracks had previously featured as B-sides on the band's various singles — "Psycho Therapy" and "Delivering the Goods" appeared on the 1992 re-release of "Youth Gone Wild", "C'mon and Love Me" appeared on both "Slave to the Grind" and "In a Darkened Room", while "What You're Doing" appeared on "Wasted Time"; only the final track, a cover of "Little Wing", was previously unreleased. The EP charted at number 58 on the Billboard 200.

Release and promotion
"Delivering the Goods" is a live recording and features Judas Priest singer Rob Halford sharing lead vocals with Sebastian Bach. The track was released as a promotional single and was later included on the A Tribute to the Priest album, while a different recording, again featuring Halford, was released on Skid Row's live EP Subhuman Beings on Tour.

"Psycho Therapy" features a guest appearance from Faster Pussycat's Taime Downe on backing vocals. Music videos were made for "Psycho Therapy" (which features a guest appearance of Joey Ramone from Ramones as an elevator operator) and "Little Wing", the latter of which was also released as a promo single. Both music videos feature on the Skid Row video album No Frills Video.

Live performances of "Psycho Therapy" and "C'mon and Love Me" feature on the Skid Row video album Road Kill. "C'mon and Love Me" was also released as a promo single and featured a rare music video from the band.

Track listing

Personnel

Skid Row
Sebastian Bach – lead vocals (tracks 2-5)
Dave Sabo – guitar
Scotti Hill – guitar
Rachel Bolan – bass, backing vocals, lead vocals (track 1)
Rob Affuso – drums, percussion

Additional musicians
Taime Downe – backing vocals (track 1)
Rob Halford – guest vocals (track 3)

Charts

Certifications

References

External links

Skid Row (American band) albums
1992 EPs
B-side compilation albums
1992 compilation albums
Atlantic Records compilation albums
Atlantic Records EPs
Covers EPs